Samra Rahimli (born 20 October 1994) is an Azerbaijani singer. In 2015, she competed in O Ses Türkiye (The Voice of Turkey) where she made it to the quarterfinals and in March 2016, she became a finalist on the first season of Səs Azərbaycan (The Voice of Azerbaijan). On 10 March 2016, she was announced as the Azerbaijani act for the Eurovision Song Contest 2016 with the song "Miracle". Rahimli performed during Semi Final 1 and successfully progressed to the Grand Final where she placed 17th with 117 points.

On 1 December 2020, she released a song titled Shusha, we are back, in relation to the Azerbaijani Armed Forces taking back the control of Shusha, during the 2020 Nagorno-Karabakh war.

Discography

Albums 

 2021: Göz

Singles

References 

Living people
1994 births
Musicians from Baku
21st-century Azerbaijani women singers
Eurovision Song Contest entrants for Azerbaijan
Eurovision Song Contest entrants of 2016
The Voice (franchise) contestants